Thijs Niemantsverdriet (born 1978) is a Dutch journalist, and since 2004, editor of the weekly Vrij Nederland. In 2008 he won the De Tegel award for journalism for his portraits of MEP  Joost Lagendijk and Dutch Minister of Foreign Affairs Frans Timmermans.

References

1978 births
Living people
Dutch journalists
Writers from Amsterdam